Arthur Skinner may refer to:

 Arthur Skinner (police officer) (1874–1940), New Zealand policeman and athlete
 Arthur Skinner (sport shooter) (1919–1993), British sports shooter
 Arthur Banks Skinner (1861–1911), director of the Art Museum division of the Victoria and Albert Museum, London